= Double letter =

Double letter, double consonant, and double vowel may refer to:

- Homogenous digraphs, orthographic duplication of a letter
- Gemination, the phonetic lengthening of consonants
  - Orthographic consonant duplication
- Vowel length, the phonetic lengthening of vowels
  - Orthographic vowel duplication
